Stonefield may refer to:

 Field of sets
 Blockfield